The Orion VII was a line of low-floor transit buses available in 30' rigid, 35' rigid, and 40' rigid lengths manufactured by Daimler Buses North America's subsidiary Orion Bus Industries between 2001 and 2013 in three generations. The conventional powered buses, either with longitudinally-mounted diesel or natural gas engines, used a T-drive transmission coupling. A series hybrid variant powered by a diesel-driven generator was also available. The Orion VII replaced the fully low-floor Orion VI and high-floor Orion V buses, and was manufactured until its parent company DaimlerChrysler withdrew from the transit bus market in 2013.

Design
The two-piece windshield of the original Orion VII has the driver's windshield canted towards the back of the bus to reduce reflections; the second and third generations also had a two-piece windshield, but both panes are curved similarly and collectively resemble a single piece. Externally, the three generations may also be distinguished by the position of the top of the doors. In the original Orion VII, the top of both the front and rear doors is at the same level as the top of the side windows. In the Orion VII Next Generation (VIING), the top of the front door is at the level as the bottom of the standee windows. In the Orion VII EPA10, the tops of both doors are at the height of the bottom of the standee windows.

The Orion VII uses a monocoque stainless steel frame clad with aluminum and fiberglass panels. The interior floor height is  except for the portion starting at the rear wheels, which is elevated to provide mechanical clearance for the engine and transmission. All conventional (diesel/CNG) buses use longitudinally-mounted engines with a T-drive transmission coupling driving the rear axle.

Models

Series hybrid
Lockheed Martin Control Systems (later acquired by BAE Systems) developed the HybriDrive™ series hybrid propulsion system used in the Orion VII. In this system, the diesel engine is mounted transversely and drives a generator, and an electric motor drives the wheels directly. A roof-mounted battery pack supplies additional power for acceleration and hill-climbing. The traction motor also operates as a generator for regenerative braking, with the power returned to the battery pack. According to a 2008 paper, the Orion VII hybrid buses, in service with New York City Transit since 2002, had per-mile maintenance costs comparable to CNG-fueled buses, with improved overall operating costs per mile mainly due to better fuel economy ( for the hybrids evaluated, compared to  diesel equivalent for the CNG buses). In 2008, it was reported that Toronto Transit Commission's Orion hybrid bus fleet suffered from early failure of lead-acid batteries in roof-mounted battery pack and much lower fuel savings than expected.

Allison hybrid
Orion announced the Allison Hybrid H 40 EP two-mode parallel/series hybrid system would be offered starting in 2011. It is not known whether any Orion VII buses were delivered with the Allison hybrid powertrain.

Deployment 
The first operator of the Orion VII was Mississauga Transit (MiWay) for the first 14 production models powered by the Detroit Diesel Series 50 diesel engine but were retired in 2013. MiWay also ordered 15 hybrids and 35 diesel BRT models in 2010 and 2012, both are in the third generation configuration.

Although New York City had previously evaluated ten Orion VI and five NovaBus RTS buses equipped with series hybrid propulsion as a small pilot program starting in 1998, the first major deployment of hybrid buses were the 125 Orion VII HybriDrive buses ordered in 2001/02.

However, only two buses, both now retired have been converted.

Starting in 2020, the MTA started retrofitting their NG HEVs with new LED lights.

The Toronto Transit Commission is another notable operator of the Orion VII, having purchased buses in both diesel and series hybrid diesel-electric propulsion configurations between 2002 and 2012. At 879 diesel buses ordered, they were the largest operator of Orion VII diesel buses in North America.

The San Francisco Municipal Railway (SF Muni) announced the acquisition of 86 series hybrid Orion VII buses in 2004, delivered in the last half of 2007; however, the hybrid buses proved to be unreliable.

Two Orion VII Hybrids are also operated by the Edmonton Transit System. Both buses were built in 2006.

Competition
 NABI LFW
 New Flyer Low Floor
 New Flyer Xcelsior
 Nova Bus LF Series
 Gillig Low Floor

References

External links

 
 

Buses of Canada
Buses of the United States
Vehicles introduced in 2001